Francesco Friedrich (born 2 May 1990) is a German bobsledder who has been active since 2006. At the 2018 Winter Olympics in Pyeongchang, South Korea, he and his brakeman Thorsten Margis tied with Canada's Justin Kripps and Alexander Kopacz for the gold medal in the two-man competition. Friedrich also won gold outright in the four-man event alongside Margis, Candy Bauer and Martin Grothkopp, making Friedrich the fifth German pilot to win two-man and four-man golds at the same Games, after Andreas Ostler in 1952, Meinhard Nehmer in 1976, Wolfgang Hoppe in 1984 and André Lange in 2006. At the 2022 Winter Olympics in Beijing, China, Friedrich and Margis again won the gold medal with both sleighs. Friedrich previously competed at the 2014 Winter Olympics in the doubles and fours and finished in eighth and tenth place, respectively.

He is the most successful athlete of the IBSF World Championships winning his first gold medal in the 2011 Königssee mixed team event. Between 2017 and 2021, he won all IBSF World Championships, two-man and four-man, increasing his number of titles to 13.

Career results

Olympic Games

World Championships

Bobsleigh World Cup

Two-man

Four-man

References

External links

Francesco Friedrich at the Bob und Schlittenverband Deutschland 

1990 births
Living people
People from Pirna
People from Bezirk Dresden
German male bobsledders
Sportspeople from Saxony
Olympic bobsledders of Germany
Bobsledders at the 2014 Winter Olympics
Bobsledders at the 2018 Winter Olympics
Bobsledders at the 2022 Winter Olympics
Olympic medalists in bobsleigh
Olympic gold medalists for Germany
Medalists at the 2018 Winter Olympics
Medalists at the 2022 Winter Olympics
21st-century German people